Kašalj is a village located in the municipality of Novi Pazar, Serbia.

References

Populated places in Raška District